All Those Wasted Years is the first live album by the Finnish rock band Hanoi Rocks, released in 1984. In initial pressing of this album's name was misspelled as "All Those Waisted Years", while correct spelling has been used with later releases of this album, but the original release with the misspelled title is very rare. The album was recorded in December 1983 at The Marquee Club in London, about a year before the death of Hanoi Rocks' drummer Razzle. The live engineer was Mick Staplehurst, the longtime FOH Engineer for Hanoi Rocks.

A video of the same shows recorded for the album was released at the same time, but with a different track listing. For example, the video featured a cover of the Ramones song "Blitzkrieg Bop" (which had Razzle on vocals and Michael Monroe on drums). The video is also missing the songs "Visitor", "11th Street Kids" and "Lost in the City"

Track listing

Personnel 
Hanoi Rocks
 Michael Monroe – lead vocals, saxophone, harmonica
 Andy McCoy – guitars, vocals
 Nasty Suicide – guitars, vocals
 Sam Yaffa – bass, vocals
 Razzle – drums, vocals

Chart positions

Album

References 

Hanoi Rocks albums
1984 live albums
Live albums recorded at The Marquee Club